Mimothestus atricornis is a species of beetle in the family Cerambycidae. It was described by Pu in 1999. It is known from China.

References

Lamiini
Beetles described in 1999